The 2021 Kwik Fit British Touring Car Championship (commonly abbreviated as BTCC) was a motor racing championship for production-based touring cars held across England and Scotland. The championship features a mix of professional motor racing teams and privately funded amateur drivers competing in highly modified versions of family cars which are sold to the general public and conform to the technical regulations for the championship. The 2021 season was the 64th British Touring Car Championship season and the eleventh season for cars conforming to the Next Generation Touring Car (NGTC) technical specification. Ash Sutton successfully defended his title to become the youngest ever three time BTCC Champion.

Teams and drivers

Driver changes 
Entering/re-entering BTCC
 Irish driver Árón Taylor-Smith returned to the series after having last raced in 2017 for MG Racing RCIB Insurance, driving a third car for Team HARD.
 Jason Plato returned to the series and Power Maxed Racing after taking a sabbatical last year due to the COVID-19 pandemic.
 Sam Smelt returned to the series after having last raced in 2018 for AmD with Cobra Exhausts, driving a new second car for Toyota Gazoo Racing UK.
 Musician and 2017 British GT Championship winner Rick Parfitt Jr. debuted with Excelr8 Trade Price Cars.
 Triple BTCC champion Gordon Shedden returned to the series and Team Dynamics, after having last raced in 2017, replacing Dan Cammish.
 2018 TCR UK winner Dan Lloyd returned to the series after having last raced in 2018 for BTC Norlin Racing, driving a Second car for Power Maxed Racing.
 Daniel Rowbottom returned to the series after having last raced in 2019 for Cataclean Racing with Ciceley Motorsport, driving a second car for Team Dynamics to replace Matt Neal.
 2018 British GT4 Championship winner Jack Mitchell debuted with Team HARD with Autobrite Direct at Oulton Park replacing Glynn Geddie.
 2013 winner Andrew Jordan returned to the series after having last raced in 2019 for BMW Pirtek Racing, driving an all new first Hybrid car for Toyota Gazoo Racing UK.
 2018 Ginetta GT5 Challenge Group AM winner Nick Halstead debuted with Excelr8 with TradePriceCars.com at Croft replacing Rick Parfitt Jr.
 Andy Wilmot returned to the series after having last raced in 2015 for Welch Motorsport, driving a sixth car for Excelr8 with TradePriceCars.com at Brands Hatch GP to replace Jack Butel.
Changed teams
 Jack Butel will move from Carlube TripleR Racing with Mac Tools to Excelr8 Trade Price Cars.
 Carl Boardley will move from HUB Financial Solutions with Team HARD to Laser Tools Racing.
 Tom Chilton will move from BTC Racing to Ciceley Motorsport.
 Jade Edwards will move from Power Maxed Car Care Racing to BTC Racing.
 Tom Ingram will move from Toyota Gazoo Racing UK to Excelr8 Trade Price Cars.
 Rory Butcher will move from Motorbase Performance to Toyota Gazoo Racing UK.
 Sam Osborne and Ollie Jackson will swap their seats between MB Motorsport and Motorbase Performance.
 Stephen Jelley will move from Team Parker Racing to Team BMW.
 Dan Cammish will move from Team Dynamics to BTC Racing after the withdrawal of Michael Crees at Thruxton.
 Senna Proctor will move from Excelr8 Motorsport to BTC Racing to replace Dan Cammish at Snetterton.
 Jessica Hawkins will move from Power Maxed Car Care Racing to Racing with Wera & Photon Group to replace Andy Neate at Snetterton.
 Paul Rivett will move from GKR TradePriceCars.com to Racing with Wera & Photon Group to replace Andy Neate at Knockhill and Thruxton.
Leaving BTCC
 Bobby Thompson will leave due to budget reasons.
 Matt Neal will take a year sabbatical from the series, being replaced by Daniel Rowbottom.
 Michael Crees will leave the series after parting company with BTC Racing.

Team changes 
 Team HARD. will switch from running the Volkswagen CC to the new Cupra León.
 TradePriceCars.com will merge with Excelr8 Motorsport and will switch from running the Audi S3 Saloon to Hyundai i30 Fastback N Performance.
 Ciceley Motorsport will switch from running the Mercedes-Benz A-Class to WSR-prepared BMW 330i M Sport cars.
 Motorbase Performance will switch from running the Honda Civic Type R (FK2) to four Ford Focus ST cars, two of which will be entered under the Motorbase banner.
 Team Dynamics will return to the Independents Championship for the first time since 2006, following the withdrawal of works backing from Honda.
 Team Parker Racing sold their TBL to Carl Boardley and will leave the championship.

Race calendar
The championship calendar was announced by the championship organisers on 20 July 2020, before it was rescheduled on 14 January 2021 in order to maximise the opportunity for spectators and guests to attend, as a result of the COVID-19 pandemic.

Season report 
The first two races of the season were won by Josh Cook. Defending champion Ash Sutton won the third race after a battle with Jake Hill in mixed weather conditions.

Results
All drivers raced under British licences.

Championship standings

Notes
No driver may collect more than one point for leading a lap per race regardless of how many laps they lead.

Drivers' Championship

Manufacturers'/Constructors' Championship

Teams' Championship

Independent Drivers' Championship

Independent Teams' Championship

Jack Sears Trophy

Notes

References

External links 

 
 TouringCarTimes

British Touring Car Championship seasons
Touring Car Championship